The 1989 San Marino Grand Prix (formally the IX Gran Premio Kronenbourg di San Marino) was a Formula One motor race held at the Imola circuit on 23 April 1989. It was the second race of the 1989 Formula One season. The race was overshadowed by Gerhard Berger's massive accident at Tamburello corner. The race was stopped for one hour and restarted. The race was won by Ayrton Senna who started from pole position. 
The Grand Prix had a total of 39 entrants, the largest amount in Formula One history. This record was equalled in the following 14 races of the season but, as of 2022, it has not been broken.

Qualifying

Pre-qualifying report
As at the previous race in Brazil, the Brabhams were easily the fastest cars in the Friday morning session. Stefano Modena was quickest on this occasion, with Martin Brundle in second. Alex Caffi pre-qualified his Dallara in third, with Nicola Larini's Osella in fourth. Only four cars went through from this session now that the injured Philippe Streiff had been replaced at AGS by Gabriele Tarquini, who had left the abortive FIRST team.

Onyx improved on their showing in Brazil, with Bertrand Gachot just missing out on pre-qualification in fifth place. The EuroBrun of Gregor Foitek was sixth, ahead of the second Osella of Piercarlo Ghinzani. The other Onyx of Stefan Johansson was eighth, followed by the second AGS of Joachim Winkelhock. Tenth was the Coloni of Pierre-Henri Raphanel, just ahead of the two Zakspeeds of Aguri Suzuki and Bernd Schneider, the Japanese driver outpacing his more experienced team-mate. Nearly four seconds adrift at the bottom of the time sheets was the Rial of Volker Weidler, despite the German trying all three of the team's cars.

Pre-qualifying classification

Qualifying report
The only change to the entry list for the San Marino Grand Prix was the arrival of Gabriele Tarquini in the second car of the small AGS team, which had only run one car in Brazil after Philippe Streiff had suffered career ending injuries in pre-season testing. A record 39 cars were entered for the Grand Prix, although only 26 were allowed to start the race.

After their defeat in Brazil, McLaren spent eight days testing at Imola prior to the San Marino Grand Prix. According to Ayrton Senna, they tested everything on the McLaren MP4/5, including aerodynamics, suspension, brakes and fuel consumption. It worked for Senna and Alain Prost, as they locked out the front row and were over 1.5 seconds faster than the Ferrari of Nigel Mansell. Riccardo Patrese showed his and Williams' revival with fourth on the grid followed by Gerhard Berger (Ferrari) with Thierry Boutsen rounding out the top six.

At Tyrrell, Michele Alboreto failed to qualify for a race for the first time since the 1981 German Grand Prix, in the new Tyrrell 018. Only one 018 was available, and although team mate Jonathan Palmer managed to sneak onto the grid in 25th in the older model 017, he raced the 018.

Qualifying classification

Race

Start and lap 4 accident (red flag)
At the start Ayrton Senna got away well but behind him Alain Prost found himself just ahead of Nigel Mansell's Ferrari but the Englishman could not find his way around Prost's McLaren.  Mansell fell off a little after that and found himself battling with Riccardo Patrese while on the second lap Ivan Capelli had a nasty accident in his March. On lap four, fifth-placed Gerhard Berger's Ferrari speared off the track at the fast Tamburello corner due to a mechanical failure. Berger hit the wall at an estimated 180 mph and when his car came to a rest it was covered in fuel and it immediately burst into flames. Three fire marshalls (Bruno Miniati, Paolo Verdi and Gabriele Violi) arrived on foot sixteen seconds after impact and the fire was put out ten seconds later; the fuel had also burned up in the inferno. The race was red-flagged and Berger escaped with broken ribs and second-degree burns.

Race restart and conclusion
The race was restarted after half an hour and run a further 55 laps on aggregate timing. This time Prost got away much better and got past Senna while behind them Mansell made a poor start and fell behind Patrese and Alessandro Nannini. On the run-down to the Tosa hairpin Senna got alongside Prost into Villeneuve and out-braked him into Tosa. The McLarens proceeded to pull away from the competition while behind them there was more drama as Stefano Modena put his Brabham into the wall rather violently, escaping unhurt. Olivier Grouillard was disqualified on Lap 5 for his car being illegally worked on by his team during the one-hour delay.

As the McLarens pulled away Mansell, Patrese, and Nannini were busy fighting over third place. It was settled in the space of three laps as Patrese retired with a timing belt failure and Mansell followed shortly afterwards with a gearbox problem. This left Nannini in third while up front Senna cruised home to victory from Prost who, in his pursuit of Senna, had suffered a spin on lap 42 at Variante Bassa. Nannini led home Thierry Boutsen, Derek Warwick in the Arrows and Jonathan Palmer in the Tyrrell. Olivier Grouillard was disqualified because Ligier illegally repaired his car on the grid before the second start. Thierry Boutsen and Alex Caffi were initially disqualified after a protest from Ligier because they had changed tyres in the pitlane before the second start, but were reinstated following an appeal.

The Prost/Senna war began to build up speed after the Frenchman said that McLaren had a pre-race agreement that whoever led into the first turn should stay there, which was ironically suggested by Senna. In Prost's view, Senna had broken this agreement by passing him partway round the first lap after the restart.

Race classification

Championship standings after the race

Drivers' Championship standings

Constructors' Championship standings

 Note: Only the top five positions are included for both sets of standings.

References

San Marino Grand Prix
San Marino Grand Prix
San Marino Grand Prix
San Marino Grand Prix